Flavien Belson Bengaber (born 22 February 1987) is a French former professional international footballer who played as a defensive midfielder. At international level, he represented Guadeloupe.

Career
Belson was born in Sainte-Adresse. He previously played for English club Milton Keynes Dons, but was released following the 2008–09 season. After leaving the English club, he played on the reserve team of his former club Metz before joining Cannes in 2010. After featuring with Cannes in three matches, Belson was released from the club. He went on a trial with Red Star Saint-Ouen before joining his Dives in January 2011.

On 16 September 2011, Belson signed for League One club Yeovil Town on a short-term contract until January 2012, and he made his début in a 3–0 loss against Carlisle United but received a first-half red card after a second bookable offence. Belson was released following just the one appearance at the end of his contract in early January 2012 along with Abdulai Bell-Baggie, Alan O'Brien and Kerrea Gilbert.

Career statistics

References

External links
 

Profile at Soccerway

1987 births
Living people
People from Sainte-Adresse
French footballers
French sportspeople of Cameroonian descent
Association football midfielders
FC Metz players
Milton Keynes Dons F.C. players
AS Cannes players
SU Dives-Cabourg players
Yeovil Town F.C. players
Ligue 1 players
English Football League players
Sportspeople from Seine-Maritime
Guadeloupe international footballers
Footballers from Normandy